Lyubomir Kleofasovich (Petrovich) Dymsha (1860–1915) – a lawyer, a member of the State Duma of the Russian Empire from Sedletskaya province. Pole, Roman Catholic faith, hereditary nobleman of the Kovno province, State Counselor.

Biography 

He was born on January 6, 1860. Son of Cleophas Petrovich Dymshi (1821–1907) and Teresa Dimshene, a neuter Gorskiite (1829–1902).

In 1878 he graduated from the German grammar school in Mitau with a gold medal, and in 1882 from the Law Faculty of the St. Petersburg University. He served in the Ministry of Education; in 1889, passed the exam at the Moscow University for a master's degree in public law, was approved in 1890 in the rank of privat-docent of the St. Petersburg University and in 1891 was sent to Sweden and Norway to study local government. In 1893, as a representative of the Ministry of Public Education, he attended the World Congress of Higher Education in Chicago. In November 1893, he was appointed to serve in the State Chancellery, in the legislative part, in the Department of Economy.

In 1896 he lectured as a private lecturer in the Department of State Law of the St. Petersburg University on local government in Great Britain, France and Prussia, then – the course of general and Russian state law (until 1911). In 1902 he defended his thesis "State Law in Sweden" at the Kazan University and was awarded a master's degree in public law.

In 1902–1905 – a vowel of the St. Petersburg City Duma, since 1905 – a friend of the chairman of the Duma. Participated in the scientific and cultural life of the Polish colony in St. Petersburg; member of a number of public, religious and other Polish organizations.
.

In 1907 he was elected to the Third State Duma from the general electors of the Siedlce Gubernia Electoral Assembly: he was a member of the Polish colo; participated in the debate on the budget, criticizing government policy regarding the Kingdom of Poland; raised the issue of discrimination of Congress Poland in their cases in courts, demanding the achievement of full equality. In the third Duma was part of the commission: administrative and for judicial reform (comrade chairman). In 1912 he was elected to the Fourth State Duma.

The landowner of the Sedlecki and Kovensk provinces (about 2000 acres of land). In 1914 he founded the Polish Society of Lawyers and Economists in St. Petersburg, and was a member of the Board of the Russian-Belgian Metallurgical Society. He collaborated in the Polish newspapers "The Polish Voice" (1913), and "The Polish Affair" (1915).

Dymsha died on November 18, 1915.

Family 

 Wife – Sofia Dymshene, born Kerbedytė (1871–1963)
 Daughter – Sofia Dymshaite in the marriage Bulgak-Gelskiene (1902–2004)

Compositions 

 State wine monopoly and its importance for combating drunkenness: Dokl. Komis. on the issue of alcoholism – SPb .: Type. PP Sojkina, 1899. - 24 p.
 State law of Sweden. Part historical. T. 1 – SPb .: Type. P. P. Soykin, 1901. - 424 p.
 The theory of separation of powers
 Local government in Sweden
 Community device in Norway
 A new form of zemstvo economy
 The national question in the 20th century
 The Holm question. - St. Petersburg, 1910 (in Polish, Warsaw, 1911)

References

External links 

 Dymsha Lubomir Kleofasovich
 Presidential Library
 The fall of the tsarist regime: verbatim records of interrogations and testimony given in 1917 in the Emergency Investigation Commission of the Provisional Government

1860 births
1915 deaths
People from Telšiai District Municipality
People from Telshevsky Uyezd
Members of the 3rd State Duma of the Russian Empire
Members of the 4th State Duma of the Russian Empire
Russian lawyers
Saint Petersburg State University alumni